William Patrick McNamara (10 January 1912 – 11 April 1983) was an Australian rules footballer who played with Melbourne and South Melbourne in the Victorian Football League (VFL).

McNamara was a wingman and half-forward, originally from St Pat's in East Melbourne. He appeared in preliminary finals for Melbourne in 1937 and 1938. Having received a clearance, McNamara joined South Melbourne for the 1939 VFL season. He won the Gardiner Medal in 1941, for his performances with the South Melbourne seconds, whom he would also coach.

He moved to Canberra in about 1960 and coached the Australian National University football team. He died suddenly in Canberra in 1983.

References

External links

 

1912 births
Australian rules footballers from Victoria (Australia)
Melbourne Football Club players
Sydney Swans players
1983 deaths